= Osmosensing =

Biological mechanism for detecting changes in environmental salinity

In biology, osmosensing is a biological mechanism for detecting changes in environmental salinity. An osmosensor is a biological molecule involved in the process. In cell biology, osmosensing is the detection of changes in the activity of water outside the cell (direct osmosensing) or the structure and composition of the cell itself (indirect osmosensing).
